Zauberberg is a ski area in eastern Austria, at Semmering Pass on the border of the states of Styria and Lower Austria.

Attractions 
Zauerberg includes facilities for sledding, snowboarding, and skiing.

External links

Ski areas in Austria
Tourist attractions in Styria
Skiing in the Alps